In mathematics, a quantaloid is a category enriched over the category Sup of suplattices. In other words, for any objects a and b the morphism object between them is not just a set but a complete lattice, in such a way that composition of morphisms preserves all joins:

The endomorphism lattice  of any object  in a quantaloid is a quantale, whence the name.

References

Category theory